Weston is a civil parish in the Borough of Stafford, Staffordshire, England.  It contains four listed buildings that are recorded in the National Heritage List for England. Of these, two are at Grade II*, the middle of the three grades, and the others are at Grade II, the lowest grade.  The parish contains the village of Weston and the surrounding countryside, and the listed buildings consist of a church and three houses.


Key

Buildings

References

Citations

Sources

Lists of listed buildings in Staffordshire